Tzedek ve-Shalom also written as Zedek ve Shalom, (Peace and Justice) is a historic synagogue in Paramaribo, Suriname. It was built for a Sephardic congregation in 1736. The synagogue stopped being used in 1999 when the area's remaining Jewish residents combined congregations at Neveh Shalom Synagogue. It is being used as a computer repair store. Its furnishings are in the collection of the Israel Museum.

The building is sited in a large courtyard, built of wood in a Neoclassical architecture style with arched windows and bench seating, and painted white. It has a wide basilica-like hall with a tevah (reader's platform) opposite the heikhal (Torah ark). Decoration included brass chandeliers from the Netherlands. It has a sandy floor.

See also
History of Jews in Suriname
Esnoga

References

Further reading
Tzedek Ve-Shalom: A Synagogue from Suriname in the Israel Museum, Jerusalem by Tania Coen-Uzzielli, Israel Museum, 2010
The Jewish Nation of the Caribbean: The Spanish-Portuguese Jewish Settlements in the Caribbean and the Guianas Mordechai Arbell, Gefen Publishing House Ltd, 2002

External links

Sephardi Jewish culture in South America
Synagogues in Suriname
Buildings and structures in Paramaribo
Collections of the Israel Museum
Sephardi synagogues